The Dexter Richardson House is an historic house at 5 South Street in Uxbridge, Massachusetts.  The  story wood-frame house was built c. 1736, and is a well-preserved local example of transitional Georgian-Federal styling.  The basic massing of the main block is Georgian, with five bays and a central entry, with a large central chimney.  The entry is framed by Federal style fluted pilasters and topped by a heavy pediment; there is a five-light transom window above the door.

On October 7, 1983, it was added to the National Register of Historic Places.

See also
National Register of Historic Places listings in Uxbridge, Massachusetts

References

External links
 Dexter Richardson House MACRIS Listing

Houses in Uxbridge, Massachusetts
National Register of Historic Places in Uxbridge, Massachusetts
Houses on the National Register of Historic Places in Worcester County, Massachusetts
Georgian architecture in Massachusetts